The University of Northampton is a public university based in Northampton, Northamptonshire, England. It was formed in 1999 by the amalgamation of a number of training colleges, and gained full university status as the University of Northampton in 2005.

History

13th Century University of Northampton
The town had a university in medieval times between 1261 and 1265 of the same name, established by royal charter after approval from King Henry III in 1261. It was the third university in England, after Oxford and Cambridge, and the 22nd in Europe. After being advised by bishops and magnates that Northampton was a threat to Oxford, Henry III dissolved the university in 1265, and signed a Royal Decree that banned the establishment of a university in Northampton.

Northampton Technical College
Northampton Technical College was opened at St George's Avenue—now the site of the Avenue Campus—in 1924. Eight years later, a new building for the college was formally opened by the Duke and Duchess of York. A School of Art opened later in 1937.

The College of Education and Nene College of Higher Education
At the beginning of the 1970s, Northamptonshire was one of the few counties in England to lack a teacher-training college. A college in Liverpool lost its home and was transferred to what is now the Park Campus. The College of Education was opened by the Secretary of State for Education and Science, Margaret Thatcher, in 1972. In 1975, this college amalgamated with the Colleges of Technology and Art to become Nene College of Higher Education, taking its name from the River Nene. In 1978, it integrated the Leathersellers College from London. 

In 1993, the college incorporated St. Andrew's School of Occupational Therapy and was granted undergraduate degree awarding powers. In 1997, it took in the Sir Gordon Roberts College of Nursing and Midwifery.

University College Northampton and University of Northampton
It became University College Northampton in 1999 and gained full university status in 2005. To gain university status it had to convince the Privy Council that a Royal Decree banning the establishment of a university in Northampton, signed by King Henry III in 1265 following the Battle of Lewes, should be repealed. In 2005, the university also received the power to validate its own research degrees, which had formerly been validated by the University of Leicester. In the graduation ceremonies in July 2006, seven students received the first doctoral degrees validated by the University of Northampton.

In January 2010, the School of Applied Sciences was renamed the School of Science and Technology and moved into the newly refurbished Newton Building at Avenue Campus. The Newton Building was officially opened in September 2010 by Princess Anne.

Northampton university campuses

Until 2018 the university had three main sites: Avenue Campus, just north of the town centre, opposite a large open park known as the Racecourse; Park Campus in Kingsthorpe to the north of the town which was the main and largest campus and an Innovation centre opposite Northampton railway station. The Avenue and Park campuses were replaced by the new Waterside campus in 2018.

The university has various types of halls of residence on its two older campuses, with just over 1,600 rooms. Most first-year students live in halls, and few second- or third-years do so. Many of them live in the Abington area, north-east of the town centre. The main halls are now located in the student village of the Waterside Campus, and include Francis Crick; Margaret Bondfield; John Clare; and Charles Bradlaugh. A former ground-floor flat in the latter is a multi-faith Chaplaincy Centre, and another in John Clare houses the Centre for Community Volunteering; Bassett-Lowke.

The university also offers accommodation at Belinda Ferrison House in the Mounts area of the town centre. In April 2012, Northampton Borough Council granted planning permission for a 464-room hall of residence on the site of the St John's Surface Car Park in the town centre. It opened in 2014 and mainly accommodates international and post-graduate students.

The university took ownership of the Grade II-listed former Kingsley Park Middle School, next door to Avenue Campus. This underwent an £11m refurbishment and housed most of the School of Science and Technology, formerly split between Avenue Campus and Park Campus. The building has been renamed the Newton Building, after Sir Isaac Newton.

The university achieved the Ecocampus Silver award in 2011.

In May 2012, the university announced plans to establish a new riverside campus in the town centre, on the site of the disused Northampton Power Station on the south bank of the River Nene and located within the Northampton Waterside Enterprise Zone (known simply as Northampton Waterside). The Waterside Campus opened to students in September 2018 with the facilities on both Park and Avenue campuses transferring to it. Proposals have been submitted to redevelop Park campus for housing whilst Avenue campus could be used for student accommodation. The Newton Building will be retained as university offices.

Organisation and administration

Governance 
The Vice-Chancellor is Nick Petford, who was preceded in the post by Ann Tate (who received an honorary degree from the university in 2011) and Martin Gaskell.

On 10 February 2008, the university appointed Baroness Falkner of Margravine as its first Chancellor. In July 2017, she was succeeded by the BBC radio presenter Richard Coles.

The Board of Governors are the members of the Higher Education Corporation and act both as governors and charitable trustees. There are 17 members of the Board of Governors. They are drawn from the private, public and voluntary sectors as well as from the staff and students of the university.

Credit union
The Changemaker Credit Union is a joint initiative between the university and Northamptonshire Credit Union, providing financial services to students and staff. Northamptonshire Credit Union is a member of the Association of British Credit Unions Limited.

Academic profile
It is divided into four faculties: the Faculty of Business & Law, the Faculty of Arts, Science & Technology, the Faculty of Health & Society; and the Faculty of Education & Humanities.

The university offers a wide range of undergraduate degrees, foundation degrees, diplomas and a variety of postgraduate opportunities up to PhD level.

Reputation and rankings 

In the 2012 Guardian University League Table, the university was ranked first for 'value added' in UK.

The university was awarded 'The Outstanding HEI Supporting Social Entrepreneurship Award' at the UnLtd/HEFCE ‘Dare to be Different’ national conference in June 2011. and has also been named the Midlands most 'Enterprising University of the Year' for both 2011 and 2012, in recognition of its work in social enterprise. In February 2013, the university received international recognition for its commitment to social innovation and entrepreneurship by being designated a 'Changemaker Campus' by Ashoka U. Northampton is the first Changemaker Campus in the UK and joins a global network of 21 other Changemaker Campuses.

Research
In the 2008 Research Assessment Exercise (RAE) the university achieved significant ratings in Business and Management; Health; Education; History; Metallurgy and Materials; English; Drama, Dance and Performing Arts; Art and Design; and Asian Studies. In the most recent 2014 Research Excellence Framework (REF), "world leading" research was found in submissions for Allied Health Professions, Art and Design, English Language and Literature, History, Geography and Environmental Studies, and Education.

Research, consultancy and knowledge transfer at the university are centred on a number of cognate research groupings. It carries out internationally renowned research into lift engineering and technology, using the Express Lift Tower in the town, reflecting the town's historic role in lift manufacturing. The Landscape and Biodiversity Research Group is within the universities' School of Science and Technology.

The university provides numerous other business support schemes and programmes for new companies. These are often run through the university's Sunley Management Centre. Other schemes run by the university include an art loan facility for offices or conferences. The university provided lab facilities for the Channel 4 programme How Clean Is Your House.

Student life

Students' Union 
The Students' Union operates out of the redeveloped Engine Shed location on the Waterside Campus, which also operates as a daytime cafe and food outlet. The Union also operates a venue in the town centre, The Platform. During the day the venue operates as a cafe and conference centre. At night the venue also operates as a nightclub with three floors and staffed by student staff. During the midweek, all events held at the venue are student only while the venue opens up the locals during the weekend with a number of different events held throughout the year.

The Union was awarded a national Gold award, as well as 'Best Club', in the national NUS Best Bar None awards 2011. This award confirms the Union as being a safe venue with effective policies on drink and drugs, crime prevention, fire, security and first aid.

The Students' Union is led by five full-time Sabbatical Officers, backed by hundreds of volunteers including an extended Elected Officer Team of Part Time Officers and supported by almost 200 staff – both student and career staff.

Sports 
The Students' Union has 35 sports clubs and enters 24 teams in Wednesday BUCS Leagues each week, with the SU currently ranked 99th in the BUCS ranking. The Students' Union operate on a policy of free sports membership, meaning all teams are free to join with no membership fee and offers a wide variety of sports including rugby league (Gremlins RL), football, netball, basketball, hockey and lacrosse. They are also one of a select SUs to offer equestrian as a sports club for their students. Sports is overseen by the Sports Coordinator with an elected Sports Part-Time Officer acting as a representative for the voice of student sports.

Since the start of the 2018–19 academic year, the Students' Union has contested a Varsity event against the University of Bedfordshire, with each institute taking it in turns to host the event each year. The SU also hosts an end of year Sports Awards event to recognise the achievement of all clubs, with awards including both performance based awards as well as charity and individual awards.

Societies 
Approximately 60 student societies are affiliated to The University of Northampton Students’ Union. These range from special interest societies such as Doctor Who and Anime to faith-based societies such as the Christian Union and Hindu Society.

NUMedia, the student-led, run and managed media society, was launched in September 2011 and is responsible for the NUNews newspaper, NURadio broadcasts and NUTube video productions.

University technical colleges
The university is an academic sponsor of two university technical colleges which opened in September 2013. Daventry University Technical College specialises in engineering, construction and environmental sustainability, Silverstone University Technical College in motorsports engineering, event management and hospitality.

Notable people

Staff
Henry Bird, taught drawing at the art school; his students included the architect Will Alsop
Dave Hill, political and educational activist, professor of education (2007–12)
Robert Kirk, professor emeritus in the department of philosophy

Alumni

 Will Alsop, modernist architect; graduated from Northampton College of Art
 Jon Bewers, footballer
 James D. Boys, academic and media consultant
 Dallas Campbell, television presenter and stage actor
 Andrew Collins, writer and broadcaster
 James Densley, academic and author
 Bill Drummond, artist, musician, writer and record producer
 Felippe Moraes, visual artist, art researcher and independent curator
 Daniel Middleton, YouTuber and writer
 Owen Paterson, Secretary of State for Environment, Food and Rural Affairs (2012–2014); graduated from Leathersellers College
 Lisa Davina Phillip, actress and singer
 Denys Watkins-Pitchford, prolific author of children's books and of rural affairs; illustrator and artist; graduated from Northampton College of Art

See also
Armorial of UK universities
College of Education
List of universities in the UK
Northamptonshire Credit Union
University of Northampton (13th century)

References

External links 

Park Campus Memories (PCM) - a tribute project about the former Park Campus, Boughton Green Road
Avenue Campus Memories (ACM) - a tribute project about the former Avenue Campus, St. George's Avenue
University website

 
Educational institutions established in 1999
1999 establishments in England
Educational institutions established in 2005
2005 establishments in England
Credit unions of the United Kingdom
Northampton
Education in West Northamptonshire District